Medetera apicalis is a species of long-legged fly in the family Dolichopodidae. It is found in Europe.

References

Further reading

 

Medeterinae
Articles created by Qbugbot
Insects described in 1843
Taxa named by Johan Wilhelm Zetterstedt